Sanhekou Township is a rural township in Cili County, Hunan Province, People's Republic of China.

Administrative division
The township is divided into 18 villages, the following areas: Sanhekou Village, Shatang Village, Wangyueping Village, Yangliu Village, Zhanma Village, Huazi Village, Yingta Village, Shuanglong Village, Tudiya Village, Guanyan Village, Xiaoxiyu Village, Shuiya Village, Fengquan Village, Sangshu Village, Chiyan Village, Shenglong Village, and Zaohua Village (三合口村、沙塘村、望月坪村、杨柳村、战马村、划字村、英塔村、双龙村、马汉村、土地垭村、关岩村、小溪峪村、水垭村、丰泉村、桑树村、池岩村、圣龙村、造化村).

References

Divisions of Cili County